Carl Anton Rom (10 March 1909 – 30 December 1994), known as Toni Rom, was a German rower who competed in the 1936 Summer Olympics.

In 1936 he won the gold medal as member of the German boat in the coxless four competition.

References

External links
 profile

1909 births
1994 deaths
Olympic rowers of Germany
Rowers at the 1936 Summer Olympics
Olympic gold medalists for Germany
Olympic medalists in rowing
German male rowers
Medalists at the 1936 Summer Olympics
Sportspeople from Würzburg
European Rowing Championships medalists